Volčja Jama is a dispersed settlement in the hills west of Šmartno pri Litiji in central Slovenia. The area is part of the historical region of Lower Carniola. The Municipality of Šmartno pri Litiji is now included in the Central Slovenia Statistical Region.

Name
The name Volčja Jama literally means 'wolf cave/pit'. The first part of the name is derived from the Slovene adjective volčji (literally, 'wolf'), which may refer to the animal (< volk 'wolf') or to the related Slavic personal name *Vьlkъ. The second part of the name is from the common noun jama 'cave, pit', referring to a geographical feature.

References

External links

Volčja Jama at Geopedia

Populated places in the Municipality of Šmartno pri Litiji